Eurexpo is a convention center and exhibition hall in the commune of Chassieu, south-east of Lyon. It is the site of the annual Foire de Lyon.

Description 

Eurexpo also houses seven restaurants and seven bars.

Events and exhibitions 

Halls 

 Hall 1
 Hall 2.1
 Hall 2.2
 Hall 2.3
 Hall 3.1
 Hall 3.2
 Hall 4.1
 Hall 4.2
 Hall 5.1
 Hall 5.2
 Hall 6.1
 Hall 6.2
 Hall 6.3

References

External links 

 Official site

Buildings and structures in Lyon
Exhibitions in France
1984 establishments in France